AHDL may refer to:
 Altera Hardware Description Language
 Analog Hardware Description Language; see field-programmable analog array
 Archives d'histoire doctrinale et littéraire du Moyen Âge, a scholarly journal publishing medieval historical and literary studies